Dry River may refer to:

Waterways
In Australia
 Dry River (New South Wales), a tributary of the Murrah River in the South Coast region of New South Wales
 Dry River (Northern Territory)
 Dry River (Queensland), a tributary of the Burdekin River
 Dry River (Victoria), a tributary of the Mitchell River catchment in the Alpine region of Victoria

In Jamaica
 Dry River (Jamaica)

In New Zealand
 Dry River (New Zealand), a river in the North Island of New Zealand

In the United States
 Dry River (Crooked River), a river in Oregon
 Dry River (New Hampshire)
 Dry River (Virginia)

Other uses
"Dry River", a song by Dave Alvin from his album Blue Blvd

See also 
 Dry Creek (disambiguation)
 Dry (disambiguation)
 Dry Brook (disambiguation)